Combe Florey is a village and civil parish in Somerset, England, situated  northwest of Taunton in the Somerset West and Taunton district, on the West Somerset Railway.  The village has a population of 261. The parish includes the hamlet of Eastcombe which is a linear settlement along the A358 Taunton-Wiliton Road.

The village public house is The Farmer's Arms.

History

The first part of the name Combe Florey comes from cwm meaning valley, and the second part from Hugh de Fleuri who was lord of the manor around 1166.

At the time of the Domesday Book in 1086 the village was part of the Bishop of Winchesters estate of Taunton Deane.
The parish of Combe Florey was part of the Taunton Deane Hundred.

Governance

The parish council has responsibility for local issues, including setting an annual precept (local rate) to cover the council's operating costs and producing annual accounts for public scrutiny. The parish council evaluates local planning applications and works with the local police, district council officers, and neighbourhood watch groups on matters of crime, security, and traffic. The parish council's role also includes initiating projects for the maintenance and repair of parish facilities, as well as consulting with the district council on the maintenance, repair, and improvement of highways, drainage, footpaths, public transport, and street cleaning. Conservation matters (including trees and listed buildings) and environmental issues are also the responsibility of the council.

The village falls within the non-metropolitan district of Somerset West and Taunton, which was established on 1 April 2019. It was previously in the district of Taunton Deane, which was formed on 1 April 1974 under the Local Government Act 1972, and part of Taunton Rural District before that. The district council is responsible for local planning and building control, local roads, council housing, environmental health, markets and fairs, refuse collection and recycling, cemeteries and crematoria, leisure services, parks, and tourism.

Somerset County Council is responsible for running the largest and most expensive local services such as education, social services, libraries, main roads, public transport, policing and fire services, trading standards, waste disposal and strategic planning.

It is also part of the Taunton Deane county constituency represented in the House of Commons of the Parliament of the United Kingdom. It elects one Member of Parliament (MP) by the first past the post system of election, and was part of the South West England constituency of the European Parliament prior to Britain leaving the European Union in January 2020, which elected seven MEPs using the d'Hondt method of party-list proportional representation.

Religious sites

The Church of St Peter and St Paul has some remains from the 13th century but is mostly from the 15th century and is designated as a Grade I listed building.

Notable residents
Sydney Smith was rector of the parish of Combe Florey from 1829 until his death in 1845.
Combe Florey House was the home of the novelist Evelyn Waugh, and later of his son, Auberon. Auberon Waugh is buried in St Peter and Paul's churchyard. Evelyn Waugh is buried in a private plot of land next to the churchyard.  The writers Daisy Waugh and Alexander Waugh both grew up at Combe Florey House, but their mother, Auberon Waugh's widow, sold the house in 2008.

References

External links

Combe Florey page from The Quantock Online Community

Villages in Taunton Deane
Civil parishes in Somerset